Joseph Sargent is an American film director.

Joseph Sargent may also refer to:
Joseph B. Sargent (1822–1907), U.S. politician
Joseph D. Sargent, American insurance executive
Joe Sargent (1893–1950), baseball player
Joe Sargent, minor character in H. P. Lovecraft's story The Shadow over Innsmouth